Keturah "Katie" Anderson (born 9 January 1968 in Kingston, Jamaica) is a Canadian retired athlete specialising in the high hurdles. She won the bronze medal at the 1999 World Indoor Championships.

She has personal bests of 12.61 in the 100 metres hurdles (1999) and 7.90 in the indoor 60 metres hurdles (1999 – former national record).

Competition record

References

External links
 
 
 
 
 

1968 births
Living people
Canadian female hurdlers
Sportspeople from Kingston, Jamaica
Athletes (track and field) at the 1988 Summer Olympics
Athletes (track and field) at the 1992 Summer Olympics
Athletes (track and field) at the 1996 Summer Olympics
Athletes (track and field) at the 2000 Summer Olympics
Olympic track and field athletes of Canada
Commonwealth Games bronze medallists for Canada
Athletes (track and field) at the 1990 Commonwealth Games
Athletes (track and field) at the 1998 Commonwealth Games
Commonwealth Games medallists in athletics
World Athletics Championships athletes for Canada
Universiade medalists in athletics (track and field)
Jamaican emigrants to Canada
Black Canadian female track and field athletes
Universiade bronze medalists for Canada
Medalists at the 1993 Summer Universiade
Medallists at the 1998 Commonwealth Games